The Common Indexing Protocol (CIP) was an attempt in the IETF working group FIND during the mid-1990s to define a protocol for exchanging index information between directory services.  

In the X.500 Directory model, searches scoped near the root of the tree (e.g. at a particular country) were 
problematic to implement, as potentially hundreds or thousands of directory servers would need to be contacted
in order to handle that query.  

The indexes contained summaries or subsets of information about individuals and organizations represented in
a white pages schema.  By merging subsets of information from multiple sources, it was hoped that an index 
server holding that subset could be able to process a query more efficiently by chaining it only to some 
of the sources: those sources which did not hold information would not be contacted.  For example, if a server 
holding the base entry for a particular country were provided with a list of names of all the people in all the 
entries in that country subtree, then that server would be able to process a query searching for a person with
a particular name by only chaining it to those servers which held data about such a person. 

The protocol evolved from earlier work developing WHOIS++, and was intended to be capable of interconnecting
services from both the evolving WHOIS and LDAP activities. 

This protocol has not seen much recent deployment, as WHOIS and LDAP environments 
have followed separate evolution paths.  WHOIS deployments are typically in domain name registrars, and its 
data management issues have been addressed through specifications for domain name registry interconnection such as 
CRISP.  In contrast, enterprises that manage employee, customer
or student identity data in an LDAP directory have looked to federation protocols for interconnection between 
organizations.

RFCs

  The Architecture of the Common Indexing Protocol (CIP)
  MIME Object Definitions for the Common Indexing Protocol (CIP)
  CIP Transport Protocols
  A Tagged Index Object for use in the Common Indexing Protocol
  CIP Index Object Format for SOIF Objects
  Registration Procedures for SOIF Template Types
  LDAPv2 Client vs the Index Mesh

See also
 Development of Common Indexing Protocol

Internet protocols
Identity management